Maria Alves da Silva Cavaco Silva  (born 19 March 1938) is the wife of Aníbal Cavaco Silva, the 19th President of the Portuguese Republic and, as such, was the First Lady of Portugal from 2006 until 2016.

A Professor of Portuguese Language and Culture, she has been dedicating her attention to education and culture issues, but also to social solidarity and cohesion.

Biography
Maria Cavaco Silva was born Maria Alves da Silva, to Francisco dos Santos Silva and Adelina de Jesus Pincho, on 19 March 1938, in São Bartolomeu de Messines, Silves (Algarve). Her mother died in her youth, and she ended up being raised by her uncle and aunt in Lisbon.

She Licentiated in Germanic Philology from the University of Lisbon in 1960. Her final thesis was about "Yearning (saudade) in Hölderlin's Poetry". She also has a degree in Pedagogical Sciences from that same University, and began working as a teacher in 1960, in the Colégio das Doroteias. She has also taught in the Liceu Passos Manuel, Liceu Rainha D. Leonor and Liceu D. João de Castro, all of them in Lisbon.

It was while holidaying in the Algarve that she met Aníbal Cavaco Silva, whom she married on 20 October 1963. Later that same year, her husband was summoned for military duty in the Colonial War, in the then-Portuguese Overseas Province of Mozambique, and Maria Cavaco Silva accompanied him. She lived in Lourenço Marques (modern-day Maputo), where she taught Portuguese language and foreign languages at Liceu Salazar and Liceu D. Ana da Costa Portugal. In 1971, they both moved to York, in England, while her husband studied Economics in the University of York. Once there, Maria Cavaco Silva attended German and Italian courses at the Language Teaching Centre, and taught Portuguese privately to foreigners. Simultaneously, she enjoyed the opportunity to deepen her knowledge of English culture and language. The Cavaco Silvas returned to Portugal in 1974.

In 1977, Maria became a lecturer of Portuguese language of the Philosophy course at the Catholic University, in Lisbon. Starting in 1981, she taught the same subject in the Theology course, and the Portuguese Language and Culture subject of the Law course of the Faculty of Human Sciences of that University. Still in this Faculty, she headed, in July/August 1985, the Luso-American summer course about "The Portuguese Language in Contemporary Portuguese Novels". She then began teaching the Annual Portuguese Course for Foreigners, in the Socrates/Erasmus programme, which she led until 2006. Today, she is still connected to that University, and occasionally gives lectures on Literature and Portuguese Culture. She was teaching there during her husband's term as Prime Minister of Portugal (from 1985 to 1995)

On 22 January 2006, her husband was elected President of Portugal, with 50,6% of the votes. She became the First Lady of Portugal, succeeding Maria José Ritta, Jorge Sampaio's wife, in March of that year. Her activity agenda included the challenges that families and the youth face in today's world, or the new demands in social assistance. As it had already happened in the 1980s and the 1990s, when her husband was Prime Minister, attending official acts and institutional events, as well as contacting with organisations, associations and several entities of the civil society, is a large part of her daily routine. The couple currently has two children and five grandchildren.

Honours

National honour
 :
 Grand Cross of the Order of Prince Henry

Foreign honours
 :
 Grand Cross of the Order of Honour for Services to the Republic of Austria
 :
 Grand Cross of the Order of the Southern Cross
 :
 Grand Cross of the Order of Bernardo O'Higgins
 :
 Grand Cross of the Order of Boyaca
 :
 Grand Cross of the Order of Merit of the Federal Republic of Germany, 1st Class
 :
 Dame Grand Cross of the Order of Saint Gregory the Great
 :
 Dame Grand Cross of the Order of Merit
 :
 Dame Grand Cordon of the Supreme Order of the Renaissance
 :
 Grand Cross of the Order of Vytautas the Great
 :
 Dame Grand Cross of the Order of Adolphe of Nassau
 :
 Grand Cross of the Order of the Republic
 :
 Grand Cross of the Order of the Aztec Eagle
 :
 Dame Grand Cross of the Order of Merit
 :
 Grand Cross of the Order of Manuel Amador Guerrero
 :
 Grand Cross of the Order of the Restitution of Poland
 Grand Cross of the Order of Merit of the Republic of Poland
 :
 Dame Grand Cross of the Order of Merit
 :
 Dame Grand Cross of the Order of Isabella the Catholic
 :
 Member Grand Cross of the Royal Order of the Polar Star

References

External links

1938 births
Living people
First Ladies of Portugal
20th-century Portuguese people
People from Silves, Portugal
Spouses of prime ministers of Portugal

Recipients of the Decoration for Services to the Republic of Austria
Recipients of the Grand Decoration with Sash for Services to the Republic of Austria
Grand Crosses 1st class of the Order of Merit of the Federal Republic of Germany
Dames Grand Cross of the Order of St Gregory the Great
Recipients of the Order of Vytautas the Great
Grand Crosses of the Order of Vytautas the Great
Recipients of the Order of Polonia Restituta
Grand Crosses of the Order of Polonia Restituta
Recipients of the Order of Merit of the Republic of Poland
Grand Crosses of the Order of Merit of the Republic of Poland
Recipients of the Order of Isabella the Catholic
Dames Grand Cross of the Order of Isabella the Catholic
Commanders Grand Cross of the Order of the Polar Star